Catherine Campbell (born 1963) is a New Zealand cricketer.

Catherine Campbell (or similar) may also refer to:
Katherine Campbell (accused witch) (c. 1677 – 1697), accused witch executed in Paisley, Scotland
Catherine Campbell Sword Stewart (1881–1957), New Zealand politician
Kathryn Campbell, Australian public servant

Kathy Campbell (born 1946), American politician in Nebraska
Cathy Campbell (c. 1962–2012), New Zealand journalist
Kathryn Campbell (karateka) (born 1990), Canadian karateka
Cate Campbell (born 1992), Australian swimmer
Kate Campbell (born 1961), American folk singer/songwriter
Kate Isabel Campbell (1899–1986), Australian physician and paediatrician
Kay Campbell (1904–1975), American actress

See also
Mary Katherine Campbell (1905–1990), Miss America 1922 and 1923
Campbell (surname)
Campbell (disambiguation)